Juliustown  is an unincorporated community and census-designated place (CDP) located within Springfield Township, in Burlington County, in the U.S. state of New Jersey, that was established as part of the 2010 United States census.  As of the 2010 Census, the CDP's population was 429.

Geography
According to the United States Census Bureau, the CDP had a total area of 1.284 square miles (3.327 km2), all of which was land.

Demographics

Notable people

People who were born in, residents of, or otherwise closely associated with Juliustown include:
Phil Haines (born 1950), Superior Court judge and former member of the New Jersey General Assembly.
Walter Livingston Wright (1872–1946), professor of mathematics and president of Lincoln University.

References

Census-designated places in Burlington County, New Jersey
Populated places in the Pine Barrens (New Jersey)
Springfield Township, Burlington County, New Jersey